Sahib Husain Mikali, was an Iranian statesman from the Mikalid family, who served the Ghaznavids and later the Seljuqs.

Biography 
Sahib is first mentioned as in sources as serving as the ra'is of his native city, Nishapur. In 1035, the Ghaznavid ruler Mas'ud I sent an army under Begtoghdi and Sahib Husain against the Seljuqs, who were stationing near Sarakhs. A battle shortly ensured, which resulted in the withdrawal of most of the Ghaznavid troops under Begtoghdi, while Sahib Husain continued to fight the Seljuqs, but was also defeated and was captured by the Seljuq Chaghri Beg. Sahib Husain later served as the vizier of the Seljuq ruler Tughril. His period as a vizier was only short; in 1054/5 he was replaced by al-Kunduri as the vizier of Tughril, and nothing is known about him after.

References

Sources
 
 
 
 

Mikalids
11th-century Iranian politicians
Year of death unknown
Year of birth unknown
Viziers of the Seljuk Empire
Ghaznavid officials
Ghaznavid generals